Decticus albifrons, the southern wartbiter, is a species of katydid in the subfamily Tettigoniinae. It is found in Southern Europe. In Central Europe it is widespread only in Lower Austria and at the Neusiedler See.

References

Orthoptera of Europe
Tettigoniinae
Insects described in 1775
Taxa named by Johan Christian Fabricius